Historically, bannimus (Latin: "we banish") was the form of expulsion of any individual from the University of Oxford, by putting the proctorial edict up in some public place, as a denunciation or promulgation of it. It also served to prevent the individual from claiming the cause of expulsion was unknown.

Individuals can still be expelled today, as well as rusticated, that is, when a student is sent down or banished from the University for a period of time before being allowed to return and further their education.

The term bannimus is related to bannition, which is the general expulsion of an individual from a university.

References

Education policy in the United Kingdom
Terminology of the University of Oxford